Philip Boakye Dua Oyinka, popularly known as Nana Asaase is a poet, literary coach and writer. He is also a member of the National Folklore Board. He was born on 12 December and comes from Koforidua  in the Eastern Region of Ghana. Nana Asaase, a name which means 'King of the Earth' in the Akan dialect Twi, was conferred on him by his grandmother. He blends English with Twi.

Education 
For his secondary education, Nana Asaase attended St. Augustine's College, Cape Coast. In 2010, he was awarded a bachelor's degree in Arts and history from the University of Ghana, Legon.

Career 
He was a public relations assistant at Saatchi & Saatchi from 2010 to 2011. In 2011, he became the public relations executive at Global Media Alliance for a year and is currently a literary couch at Asaase Inscription.

List of his poetry works 
Life of Colours-Sancho Ignites 
Communion of Lies
Sternly to the Day; Gently to the Earth
Intoxicated Mirrors-London on fire
Ephiphania
Mental Pictures V

Mental Pictures V

Awards and recognition 
He was acknowledged for his contributions in putting Ghanaian poetry in the limelight. This was at the first edition of the Ghana Writers Awards.

References 

Year of birth missing (living people)
Living people
Ghanaian poets